Ratnākaraśānti (also known as Śāntipa) (c. 10th-century CE) was one of the eighty-four Buddhist Mahāsiddhas and a monk at the monastic university of Vikramashila in what is now modern-day Bihar in India. At Vikramashila he was instructed by Nāropa, and taught both Atīśa and Maitrīpa. His texts include several influential commentaries to Buddhist tantras, as well as works of philosophy and logic.

He was known as kalikālasarvajña meaning "Omniscient One of the Degenerate Age".

Life
Little is known about his life; in the Biography of the Eighty-Four Siddhas, Abhayadatta Sri records that "King Kapina" invited Ratnākaraśānti to Śrī Laṇka during the reign of the Pāla king Devapāla (c. 810-850 CE). However, according to Keith Dowman, "As history of Śrī Laṇkā the legend is incomprehensible. There is no King Kapina in the lists of Siṇghala kings… [and] there is no evidence of a Śāntipa contemporary with the Pāla Emperor Devapāla." Tāranātha provides a more realistic date, placing him during the reign of King Canaka (955-83 CE).

Ratnākaraśānti composed three commentaries to the Guhyasamāja Tantra, as well as commentaries to the Hevajra Tantra and the Mahāmāyā Tantra. His exoteric works, generally written from a Yogācāra perspective, include several commentaries to the Perfection of Wisdom literature, such as his Sāratamā and Pith Instructions for the Perfection of Wisdom (Prajñāpāramitābhāvanopadeśa). He is also the author of two commentaries to Śāntarakṣita's Madhyamākalaṃkāra, and a technical treatise on the formal logic of pramāṇa theory (the Antarvyāptisamarthana).

Ratnākaraśānti was a Yogācāra philosopher who defended the Alikākāravāda view of Yogacara as well as the compatibility of Madhyamaka with this Yogacara view.

See also
Mahasiddha

Notes

References
Abhayadhatta and Robinson, James (trans.) (1979). Buddha's Lions: The Lives of the Eighty-Four Siddhas. Berkeley: Dharma Publishing. 
Dowman, Keith (1986). Masters of Mahamudra: Songs and Histories of the Eighty-four Buddhist Siddhas. Albany: State University of New York Press. 
Tāranātha, Lama Chimpa and Chattopadhyaya, Alaka (trans.) (1970). Tāranātha’s History of Buddhism in India. Simla: Indian Institute of Advanced Study. 
Tatz, Mark (1998). "Maitrī-pa and Atiśa," in Tibetan Studies: Proceedings of the 4th Seminar of the International Association for Tibetan Studies, ed. Helga Uebach and Jampa L. Panglung. Munchen: Kommission für Zentralasiatische Studien Bayerische Akademie der Wissenschaften.

External links
The Antarvyāptisamarthana of Ratnākaraśānti
The Āloka of Haribhadra and the Sāratāma of Ratnākaraśānti: A Comparative Study of the Two Commentaries of the Aṣṭasāhasrikā
Luminosity: Reflexive Awareness in Ratnākaraśānti's Pith Instructions for the Ornament of the Middle Way

Tibetan Buddhist spiritual teachers
Indian scholars of Buddhism
History of Bihar
Monks of Vikramashila
Yogacara
Vajrayana
Mahayana Buddhism writers
Mahasiddhas